Ginsuanhau Zou is an Indian politician of Manipur and member of the Bharatiya Janata Party. He was elected as a member of the Manipur Legislative Assembly from Singhat constituency in Churachandpur District from the Indian National Congress in 2012 & 2017 Manipur Legislative Assembly election.

During the 2020 Manipur vote of confidence, he was one of the eight MLAs who had skipped the assembly proceedings defying the party whip for the trust vote. He resigned from Indian National Congress and later joined Bharatiya Janata Party in presence of Ram Madhav, Baijayant Panda and Chief Minister of Manipur N. Biren Singh. He was elected unopposed from Singhat in 2020 Assembly By-elections.

References

Living people
Manipur MLAs 2012–2017
Manipur MLAs 2017–2022
Manipur politicians
Bharatiya Janata Party politicians from Manipur
Year of birth missing (living people)
Indian National Congress politicians from Manipur
People from Churachandpur district